Girton College is one of the 31 constituent colleges of the University of Cambridge. The college was established in 1869 by Emily Davies and Barbara Bodichon as the first women's college in Cambridge. In 1948, it was granted full college status by the university, marking the official admittance of women to the university. In 1976, it was the first Cambridge women's college to become coeducational.

In a typical Victorian red brick design, most was built by architect Alfred Waterhouse between 1872 and 1887. It provides extensive sports facilities, an indoor swimming pool, an award-winning library and a chapel with two organs. There is an accommodation annexe, known as Swirles Court, situated in the Eddington neighborhood of the North West Cambridge development. Swirles opened in 2017 and provides up to 325 ensuite single rooms for graduates, and for second-year undergraduates and above.

The college has a reputation for admitting a high number of UK state-school students, its community feel, and for musical talent. Several art collections are held on the main site, including People's Portraits, the millennial exhibition of the Royal Society of Portrait Painters, and an Egyptian collection containing the world's most reproduced portrait mummy.

Among Girton's notable alumni are Queen Margrethe II of Denmark, former UK Supreme Court President Lady Hale, HuffPost co-founder Arianna Huffington, the comedian/author Sandi Toksvig, the comedian/broadcaster/GP Phil Hammond, the economist Joan Robinson, and the anthropologist Marilyn Strathern, also Mistress from 1998 to 2009.

Its sister college is Somerville College, one of the two Oxford colleges to first admit women.

History

1869 to 1976: Pioneering for women's education
The early feminist movement began to argue for the improvement of women's education in the 1860s: Emily Davies and Barbara Bodichon met through their activism at the Society for the Employment of Women and the Englishwoman's Review. They shared the aim of securing women's admission to university. In particular, they wanted to determine whether girls could be admitted at Oxford or Cambridge to sit the Senior and Junior Local Examinations. Davies and Bodichon set up a committee to that effect in 1862. In 1865, with the help of Henry Tomkinson, Trinity College alumnus and owner of an insurance company with good contacts within the University, 91 female students entered the Cambridge Local Examination. This first concession to women's educational rights met relatively little resistance, as admission to the examination did not imply residence of women at the university site.

At that time, students had the option of doing a Pass degree, which consisted of "a disorderly collection of fragmented learning", or an Honours degree, which at that time meant the Mathematics Tripos, classics, natural or moral sciences. An Honours degree was considered more challenging than the Pass degree. In 1869, Henry Sidgwick helped institute the Examinations for Women, which was designed to be of intermediate difficulty. This idea was heavily opposed by Emily Davies, as she demanded admittance to the Tripos examinations.

The college was established on 16 October 1869 under the name of the College for Women at Benslow House in Hitchin, Hertfordshire, which was considered to be a convenient distance from Cambridge and London. It was thought to be less "risky" and less controversial to locate the college away from Cambridge in the beginning. The college was one of England's first residential colleges for women. (Whitelands College, now part of the University of Roehampton, was established as a college of higher education for women earlier, in 1841.) They worked with Fanny Metcalfe to develop the curricula.

In July and October 1869, entrance examinations were held in London, to which 21 candidates came; 16 passed. The first term started on 16 October 1869, when five students began their studies: Emily Gibson, Anna Lloyd, Louisa Lumsden, Isabella Townshend and Sarah Woodhead. Elizabeth Adelaide Manning was also registered as a student, although with the intention of staying for a single term, and her step-mother Charlotte Manning was the first Mistress. The first three students to unofficially sit the Tripos exams in Lent term 1873, Rachel Cook and Lumsden, who both took the Classical Tripos, as well as Woodhead, who took the Mathematical Tripos, were known as "The Pioneers".

Through fundraising, £7,000 were collected, which allowed for the purchase of land either at Hitchin or near Cambridge in 1871. By 1872, sixteen acres of land at the present site were acquired near the village of Girton. The college was then renamed Girton College, and opened at the new location in October 1873. The buildings had cost £12,000, and consisted of a single block which comprised the east half of Old Wing. At the time, thirteen students were admitted.

In 1876, Old Wing was completed, and Taylor's Knob, the college laboratory and half of the Hospital Wing was built. In the following year, Caroline Croom Robertson joined the management team as secretary to reduce the load on Emily Davies. In 1884, Hospital Wing was completed, and Orchard Wing, Stanley Library and the Old Kitchens added. At that time, Girton had 80 students. By 1902, Tower Wing, Chapel Wing and Woodlands Wing as well as the Chapel and the Hall were finished, which allowed the college to accommodate 180 students.

In 1921, a committee was appointed to draft a charter for the college. By summer 1923 the committee had completed the task, and on 21 August 1924 the King granted the charter to "the Mistress and Governors of Girton College" as a Body Corporate. Girton was not officially a college yet, nor were its members part of the University. Girton and Newnham were classed as "recognised institutions for the higher education for women", not colleges of the university. On 27 April 1948, women were admitted to full membership of the University of Cambridge, and Girton College received the status of a college of the university.

1976 to present: Pioneering for sexual equality
Social and cultural changes in the post-war period led to an increasing number of British universities to become co-educational. In Cambridge, Churchill College, King's College and Clare College were the first men's colleges to admit women in 1972. Girton had already amended its statutes in 1971 in such a way as to allow the admission of men should the Governing Body vote in favour at an unspecified date in the future. The decision to become mixed came in November 1976, when the Governing Body voted to act upon the statute, which made Girton the first women's college to admit men. In January 1977, the first two male Fellows, Frank Wilkinson and John Marks, arrived, followed by male graduate students in 1978, and, finally, undergraduates in October 1979. One reason for the change was that the first mixed colleges in Cambridge immediately shot to the top of the Tripos league tables, as they seemed to attract bright students, who preferred to stay in co-educational colleges.

Girton became co-residential as well, which meant that male and female students shared the same facilities. Only one all-female corridor in which rooms were reserved exclusively for women remained. Upon the arrival of male undergraduates, JCR and MCR social facilities had to be enlarged. The college bar was opened in 1979 as well as rugby, cricket and soccer pitches provided from 1982 onwards.

In the 22-year period from 1997 to 2019, the Tompkins Table annual ranking of Cambridge colleges by undergraduate academic performance ranked Girton College an average of 20 out of the 29 colleges researched. In 2019, it came 20th, with 22% of all undergraduate students gaining a First class.

Mistresses

The mistress is the formal head of the college. Her main task is to exercise general superintendence over the college's affairs. She presides over the college council and several college committees. The mistress is elected by the council, and has to reside at the college precincts for at least two-thirds of each term, or 210 days of each academic year. Ever since the establishment of Girton College, the position has been held by a female, even though male candidates have had equal rights for running for the office since 1976 and would, if elected, be called by the female term "mistress".

The current mistress is Elisabeth Kendall, who in 2022 succeeded Susan J. Smith; she had held the position since 2009.

Accommodation and fees

The cost of undergraduate and graduate accommodation at £180.50 per week is the most expensive of all 31 Cambridge colleges. But Girton is unique in setting a cohort charge, which means that the price of accommodation is fixed for an incoming cohort for the three years of their degree, whilst students at other colleges are subject to unknown rent rises every year. The college consults regularly with the JCR and MCR on its policy of charging equal rents for all non-en suite rooms. The college recently introduced a Residence Bursary scheme, whereby any student in receipt of a Cambridge Bursary receives a rent discount of £20 per week for all weeks of their tenancy; for these students the median rent is amongst the lowest of the Cambridge colleges.

The Cambridge Student wrote in 2018: "An investigation carried out by TCS has revealed that, at the lower end of the scale, £70 a week is enough to stay at Peterhouse and Trinity Hall, while Girtonians must shell out £160 for even the worst rooms. Such a huge spread of minimum rents creates significant disparities in a less well off student’s ability to enjoy Cambridge life, especially given that many are not aware of the price of accommodation when applying." However, the article also notes that some colleges charge extra facility or kitchen charges, some over £200, which is not the case at Girton.

Undergraduates
Girton, along with Newnham College, are the only colleges to charge the same fee for undergraduate accommodation on their premises. The main site offers 348 rooms, rented for the entire year (38 or 39 weeks, depending on the term dates). The weekly rent for the incoming undergraduate cohort of 2019/20 was £180.50. According to the Varsity student paper: "All students at Girton have to pay for 37 weeks a year, making it the most unavoidably expensive college on an annual basis – with an average termly rent of £1973.33.”

Rooms in the main site are arranged along corridors, which makes it possible to walk from one location in the building to another without going outside. Some of the rooms originally designed as sets by Alfred Waterhouse. The rooms range in several quality grades but are all charged at the same weekly rate. Every year, a ballot is organised by the JCR to determine room distribution. To first years, rooms are allocated randomly. It is customary for Cambridge colleges to provide accommodation for the first three-year undergraduate students.

Most undergraduate students live in the main site, and second years have the option of living at Swirles Court, or at one of the college houses: The college owns six houses along Girton Road, another one located opposite the college on Huntingdon Road called The Gate and one house located on the college grounds, called The Grange. These houses are available for second and third year undergraduates.

Graduates and fellows
Since 2017, graduate students live in Swirles Court. It is part of the Eddington development in West Cambridge. One house on Huntingdon Road is used to accommodate research fellows. The Graduate Union specifically identified Girton as providing an insufficient amount of housing to married postgraduates, with no rooms available at Swirles Court for married students. Girton is, however, one of only two Cambridge colleges that guarantees ensuite accommodation for all graduate students.

Swirles Court
Swirles Court, part of the Eddington neighbourhood of the North West Cambridge Development, opened in 2017.

Girton's graduate accommodation is the farthest from the city centre among all Cambridge (and Oxford) colleges, the most expensive of all Cambridge colleges, and a kilometre further from the college main site and dining facilities. The bus ride to the city centre takes approximately 20 minutes.

Named after Bertha Swirles (Lady Jeffreys), a Girton alumna, it provides 325 ensuite rooms for graduate students. Unlike the main college site, which closes for two weeks during Christmas break, Swirles is open year-round to student living. It also has a college porter on staff 24/7, separate laundry facilities, and a separate mailing address from the main college. Girton College does not own Swirles Court but leases it on a five-year renewable contract from the university.

Wolfson Court
In 2017, Girton College moved the graduate accommodation from Wolfson Court (half a kilometre from the city centre) to Swirles Court (five kilometres away). Wolfson Court was an annexe to Girton College built on a  site. It was funded by the 1969 Centenary Appeal, and designed in 1971 by Cambridge architects David Roberts and Geoffrey Clarke. It had its own catering and accommodation facilities (106 single student rooms). Queen Elizabeth Court, which was linked to the main building and comprised two blocks of three linked houses (36 large single student rooms), was built for the purpose of graduate accommodation in 1992. It was frequently used as a location for conferences. The site also contained a nursery, operated by Bright Horizons.

Main site

Architecture
The initial and defining parts of the college were designed by Alfred Waterhouse: The architect built the main site with the Old Wing, the Hospital Wing, the Orchard Wing, the Stanley library and Old Kitchens between 1873 and 1886, as well as the parapetted gatehouse tower in 1886 and 1887. The red brick design (English bond) is typical of Victorian architecture, and is enhanced by black mortar courses and terracotta details to the eaves, windows and doorways. The roofs are steeply pitched with crested tiles. In 1913, the site consisted of 33 acres.

Library

Girton's first library, the Stanley library, was established in 1884 with a donation from Lady Stanley of Alderley. It was considered to be luxurious and comfortable, as it contained stained-glass windows, leather furniture and a large chimney. Books were acquired mostly through donations. By 1932 the collection had become so large that a new library was opened. Designed by Michael Waterhouse, descendant of the architects Paul Waterhouse and Alfred Waterhouse, the new library consisted of an upper reading room, crafted in oak, and a ground floor, in which the book collections are held. An annexe containing archives was added in 1967. The Duke building, a modern library extension offering IT facilities and a reading room, was opened in 2005. Named after Alison Duke, a fellow and major donor, the building was designed by Allies and Morrison. It won a national RIBA award in 2006, a SCONUL Library Design Award in 2007, and a Civic Trust Award in 2007.

Chapel

Emily Davies first mooted plans for a chapel in Girton college in 1890; however, building only started in 1899, four years after the death of Henrietta Stanley, Baroness Stanley of Alderley, who had opposed the idea and instead favoured improving staff salaries and equipment. The chapel, which was designed by Alfred and Paul Waterhouse, was completed in 1901, and inaugurated on 23 May 1902. It seats about 200 people and the interior is held very simply with the exception of oak carvings at the Chancel end and on two long desks in front of the choir seats, which were crafted by the mathematician Margaret Meyer, along with students and friends of the college. In 1910 came a fine Harrison & Harrison organ, the purchase of which was made possible through donations from students and friends of the college. The organ was rebuilt in 1974 and can still be found in the college chapel. A second organ was acquired in 2002.

In 1952, the year of the Golden Jubilee of the inauguration, a stained glass window was erected. In the Girton Review, the college's official termly newsletter, from Michaelmas term 1955, a description of the glass window can be found:
 The centre light depicts Our Lord in Majesty, as it were the culmination of the Tree of Jesse and in the form described in the book of Revelation. The Lamb who may alone open the book sealed with seven seals is shown at the foot of the light, while the descent of the Holy Spirit in the form of a dove is shown at its apex. The flowers and fruit in the centre light represent the Tree of Jesse. The two lights flanking that in the centre depict scenes from the Passion of Our Lord. On the left are the entry into Jerusalem, the Betrayal of Judas and the Ecce Homo: on the right, the Scourging, Christ bearing His Cross, the Crucifixion. The scenes are linked with a pattern of leaves. Palm is used for the Entry into Jerusalem, and among other plants represented are the Star of Bethlehem, the Passion Flower and the Thorn. The lowest medallion on the right, portraying the crucifixion, is darker than the others, suggesting the darkness that was over the land. The uppermost tracery light depicts the Pelican in her Piety, and the remaining tracery lights contain the symbols of the Passion; the betrayal money, Peter’s lantern, pillar and scourges, dice, ladder and nails, hammer and pincers, crown of thorns and chalice.
In the original statement of aims and scope for the 'Proposed College for Women' in 1867, it was announced that religious services and instruction would be in accordance with the principles of the Church of England, but where conscientious objections were entertained, attendance would not be necessary. A modified version of this statement appears in the modern college statutes, where it reads that "services in the Chapel shall normally be held in accordance with the practice of the Church of England, but other religious services may also be held there."
At the outset, Chapel was used for morning prayers, usually said by the Mistress, and for Sunday services, taken by clergy of various denominations. Today, at least two services are held on a weekly basis: Evensong on Sunday at 5:30pm, and Compline on Tuesday at 10pm. They are organised by the college's part-time chaplain, who is assisted by student chapel wardens. The Mistress holds general responsibility in regard to services in the chapel, which she partly delegates to the Chapel Committee. The current Chaplain is the Reverend Dr Malcolm Guite, a poet and singer-songwriter, who is also a bye-fellow at Girton.

Gardens

When the land was bought, trees were planted on bare land. Today, the gardens of Girton are large compared to those of other Cambridge colleges. They became a preoccupation for the college in 1875 when Miss Davies handed over the responsibility for developing the gardens to Miss Bernard. A pond, which originated from excavations for the construction of the Stanley library and the Orchard Wing, dates from 1884. A 1983 report of the college ornithologists' society found sixty species of birds, and a moth report from 1986 recorded over 100 species. The Fellows' garden was redesigned in 1992 and hosts a green theatre. Outdoor plays are no longer performed in the Fellows' garden because of noise from the A14. A rare breed of black squirrels can sometimes be seen in Girton.

Lawrence Room

In 1934, the Lawrence Room on the college main site was dedicated to be the college museum. Named after Girton natural scientist Amy Lawrence, it houses an Anglo-Saxon, an Egyptian and a Mediterranean collection. Before the establishment of the Lawrence room in 1934, antiquities had been stored in and around the college library. Donations allowed for refurbishments in 1946, 1961, 1991 and 2008. In 2010/11, Lawrence room is opened once a week to visitors. The exhibitions are free of charge.

The Anglo-Saxon collection stems from excavations on the college main site made during construction work in 1881 and 1886, when an Anglo-Saxon cemetery, presumably from the fifth and sixth century AD, was discovered. Most findings, such as domestic utensils and personal items, were long held in the Museum of Archaeology and Anthropology in Cambridge. Some were only returned to the college as late as in 2008.

The highlight of the Egyptian collection consists of a portrait mummy bearing the inscription Hermionê Grammatikê (translation: 'Hermione the literary lady' or 'Hermione the language teacher'). It is one of the most widely reproduced and famous portrait mummies. Dating from the first century AD, it was discovered in the Roman cemetery of Hawara by the archeologist Flinders Petrie in 1911. 'Hermione' is thought to be an 18- to 25-year-old girl from a wealthy background. Petrie and his wife Hilda wanted the mummy to go to a women's college due to its inscription. Funds were gathered, and in 1911 'Hermione' moved to Girton college, where she has remained since then. The Egyptian collection also holds four mummified baby crocodiles, which were thought to bring favour of Sobek, the ancient god of fertility and water. They were presented to the college by Alfred Waterhouse senior, the father of architect Alfred Waterhouse.

The Mediterranean collection offers both Classical and pre-Classical material. A collection of Greek Tanagra figurines, which date to the fourth and third century BC, form the most remarkable pieces of this collection.

People's Portraits

Since 2002, Girton has held the millennial exhibition of the Royal Society of Portrait Painters, entitled People's Portraits.

The exhibition, aimed at showing "ordinary" British people at the verge of the 21st century, toured Britain in 2000. Girton then won the bid to house the collection, to which new works are added annually. All pictures were created by members of the Royal Society of Portrait Painters. The collection currently comprises 45 paintings, and artists include Anthony Morris, Daphne Todd, June Mendoza and Alastair Adams, the current president of the Society. The choice of Girton, one of the largest and thus most diverse colleges in Cambridge, to hold the collection is believed to reflect the college ethos of community and interest in art.

Social Spaces
Girton's Social Hub, nicknamed 'Schlub' by the students, acts as both a café for students during the day and a bar in the evenings. Handmade, personalised paninis and pizzas are available during the day and pints as cheap as £2.70 are available during the day. Girton's cellar bar, nicknamed 'Deep Schlub' by students, contains a pool table, booths and a social space for students to socialise in the evenings to take a break from their demanding work schedule. The 'Deep Schlub' also hosts college 'bops' organised by the JCR committee (college student council). As of 21st of November 2022, the 'Deep Schlub' has been shut in the 'Great Deep Schlub Closure of 2022', severely impacting student mental wellbeing.

Student life

Formal Hall 
Among all Cambridge colleges, Girton and Kings have the fewest Formal Halls at only once per week. Girton also has Formal Halls on some Wednesdays. There are only around 160 spots available per week, and tickets sell out within minutes each week. The cost of formal hall is also higher than average compared to other colleges. Tickets for Girton students cost £14 and guests tickets cost £19, as of 2022. Reservations must be made a week in advance at 8am Thursday morning. Unlike many other colleges, reservations made the day or morning of the Formal Hall are not allowed. The increase of Formal Halls was due to the COVID-19 pandemic, where a Formal Hall was held on Wednesday and Thursday but both with a lower number of tickets than usual.

Sport teams 

Girton college has a variety of student-run sports teams and it provides its own sports pitches for cricket, football, hockey, lacrosse, netball and volleyball. An extensive refurbishment of the pitches was completed in 2009. There are men's and women's teams for badminton, football, hockey, rowing (Girton College Boat Club) and rugby. Hockey has a mixed team as well. Cricket, cross country, lacrosse, netball, squash, swimming, table tennis, tennis, volleyball and waterpolo teams are open to both male and female participants. The college has outdoor tennis and indoor squash courts, and a gym. The indoor-heated swimming pool has been in use since 1900. A one-mile running path leads around the college grounds. College alumni are currently raising money in order to build a new sports pavilion.

In 1995 the men's football team won Cuppers for the first time and in 1997–98 they followed this up by winning their first League Championship. in 2003–04, Girton won the League Championship for a second time.

Music 
The college has a strong history of music, which is supported by the university's Chairman of the Faculty Board of Music, also Director of Studies in Music at Girton. In the last decade, the college has consistently been within the top three colleges for music in the university. In 2005, the highest ever first-class honours in the music Tripos was attained by a Girtonian. The student-run and fellow-led Girton College Music Society hosts weekly concerts in term time, as well as termly orchestral concerts. The college provides four practice grand pianos (including a Steinway Model B), a double-manual harpsichord and two organs. Moreover, all undergraduate music students are provided with a practice piano in their room for the duration of their course. The chapel's organ is a four-manual, crafted by the Swiss firm St. Martin and acquired in 2002.

The chapel choir has 28 members and sings Choral Evensong (Sunday) and Compline (Tuesday) in the college chapel every week. The choir has released eight CDs. Girton grants two undergraduate organ scholarships for £300 per annum, choral scholarships for £100 per annum each, and choral exhibitions.

Societies 
Admitting undergraduate students studying all subjects except for the History of Art and Education Triposes, the college hosts a variety of student-run societies which cater for a wide range of interests. Seven subjects have their own societies: Biology, History, Economics (Joan Robinson society), Geography, Music, Medicine and Law. There is furthermore the Art society, the Film society and the Girton Amateur Dramatic Society (GADS) which produces around two plays per term. Finally, Girton Amnesty and the Orchestra on the Hill serve students with specific interest in human rights and music, respectively.

Spring Ball 

Girton Spring Ball is understood to have evolved from a traditional dance, the earliest record of which dates to 1883; it was only in the mid-1900s that the Ball began to resemble its contemporary form, notably in 1969 when the College celebrated its centenary anniversary. Currently, the Ball is usually held biennially on the Friday after the end of Lent term, contrasting with most other Cambridge Colleges who host May Balls. It is organised by a committee of around 20 current Girton students. Recent Girton Balls have become much larger and more decadent than their earlier counterparts and the majority of the College site is now included in the Ball area.

The 2016 Spring Ball, to feature headliners Tinchy Stryder and Bipolar Sunshine, was anticipated to be the largest and greatest Girton Ball to date. It ultimately received widespread media attention when it was cancelled by Girton College Council following the death of a student at the college. Cancellation was then implemented and overseen almost exclusively by senior officials of the college, with all ticket holders receiving full refunds.

Student satisfaction surveys

In a survey dating back 2018 by the Cambridge University Students' Union, 45% of Girton students agree with the statement: "I am fully satisfied with my teaching and learning experience in Cambridge so far." 44% of Girton students reported being satisfied with the impact of living in college.

Varsity reported that only 15% of Girton students feel their rent costs have "value for money". Only Newnham ranked lower at 10%. The Girton bursar reported to Varsity  in 2018 that college's fees are “simple, fair and transparent" and that “the overall package provided to Girton students represents excellent value for money.” Disagreeing with Girton's statement, the Student Union reported that Girton students are getting lower quality accommodation for unusually high rents. "Students at these colleges appear not to be getting good value for money. Women’s colleges are significantly overrepresented in this group."

Notable alumni and fellows
The mistress is the head of house and the position is currently held by a human geographer, Susan Smith. The college is home to an interdisciplinary group of critical social scientists. It also has a tradition in heterodox economics, spearheaded by Joan Robinson. The Robinson fellowship in economics is currently held by Carolina Cristina Alves.

Symbolism

Arms

The college applied for a coat-of-arms derived from the arms of its founders and benefactors: H.R. Tomkinson, Madame Bodichon (née Leigh Smith), Henrietta Stanley, Baroness Stanley of Alderley (daughter of the 13th Viscount Dillon), and Emily Davies who did not have arms and was instead represented by the Welsh colours, vert and argent. Edward Earle Dorling submitted a variety of designs to the council, however the task was not easy. "A patch-work of elaborate charges and many colours was to be avoided. Mr Tomkinson's fascinating martlets and Lady Stanley's lion had to be abandoned with regret, as was also a design of green and silver chequers which would have given more prominence to Miss Davies."

Finally in 1928 the design was accepted by all and the college was granted the following:

We … grant and assign unto The Mistress and Governors of Girton College the Arms following that is to say: Quarterly Vert and Argent a cross flory countercharged a Roundel Ermine and in the second and third quarters a Crescent Gules, … to be borne and used for ever, hereafter by the Mistress and Governors of Girton College and by their Successors upon Seals Shields or otherwise according to the Laws of Arms.

Gown

The college gown has the standard pattern of an undergraduate gown at the University of Cambridge, with the sleeves sewn up for a length of eight inches from the shoulder. The proper dress of the gown and cap was observed at the first honorary degree to a woman, given to the Queen, an LL.D. on 21 October 1948. As academic dress, gowns were adopted with little changes (the sleeves had to be closed so that even in the summer, when women wear short-sleeved dresses their bare shoulders do not show), and square caps were chosen as head-dress. However, to remember the time when women were not allowed to obtain degrees of the University of Cambridge, no gowns are worn during the college feast, when students in their final year are celebrated.

Graces
Girton College has a traditional two-word grace and a more recent full grace, both in Latin.  On regular formal occasions, such as Formal Halls, the two-word graces are spoken, Benedictus benedicat (May the blessed one give blessing) at the start of the meal, and Benedictus benedicatur (May praise be given to the blessed one) at the end of the meal. There is evidence that the two-word grace was used in 1926, and it is thought the two-word grace  was used from the foundation of the college onwards.

The words and the music of the full grace were composed in 1950 by Alison Duke and Jill Vlasto respectively. The grace came after the admission of women to full membership of the university so as to bring Girton in line with the other colleges. It is used on the most formal occasions, such as the Foundation Dinner, and it is sung once a year at the College Feast, which all final year students attend.

Full grace (in Latin):

Benedic Domine, nobis et omnibus huius collegii alumnis,
donisque tuis quae de munificentia tua sumus iam sumpturi;
et illis salubriter nutriti debitas tibi gratias pie reddamus.
Custodi, quaesumus, Domine, filios et filias
et consule necessitatibus animarum et corporum,
hoc ipso momento et in aeternum.

Full grace (English translation):
Bless us, O Lord, and all members of this college,
and also thy gifts, which of thy bounty we are about to receive;
and having been wholesomely nourished by the same let us dutifully render to thee the thanks that are owed.
Protect, we beseech thee, O Lord, thy sons and daughters and provide for the needs both of our souls and bodies,
at this present time and for evermore.

Songs

The oldest college song, The Girton Pioneers, was composed by several students in Hitchin in 1873. Its purpose was to celebrate the first three students who sat the Tripos examinations in 1871. It is sung with the tune of The British Grenadiers. This is the first stanza:

Some talk of Senior Wranglers,
And some of Double Firsts,
And truly of their species
These are not the worst;
But of all the Cambridge heroes
There’s none that can compare
With Woodhead, Cook and Lumsden,
The Girton Pioneers.

More recently, Girtonians have become known for their chant of We are Girton – super Girton! No one likes us, but we don't care!, in imitation of the Millwall fans' famous song: No one likes us, we don't care. The reference to no one likes us is supposedly due to the relative distance of Girton in comparison to many of the other colleges. In 2016 the Casual Choir performed Long Way to Girton College, an adaptation of It's a Long Way to Tipperary, written and arranged by two choir members.

The college song I love to go a-bicycling, sung with the tune of I love to go a-wandering also alludes to Girton's 2.5 miles distance from the town centre. It has been sung since the 1960s. For example, the second stanza reads:
But when I climb up Castle Hill
In the wind and squall
A strong desire does then me fill
To be-e at New Hall.

Chorus:
Fol-de-re, Fol-de-ra,
Fol-de-re, Fol-de-ra-a-a-a-
.... To be-e at New Hall.

Another song, composed in 1972 by JCR president Anna Cocconi, is called Song to Wolfson Court. The annexe of the college was opened in that year. Students often found fault with the modern architecture of the building, which was less spacious and elegant than the main site. The first two stanzas go as follows:
 In a wheat field, west of Cambridge,
Off a lane called Clarkson Road,
Wolfson Court is standing proudly;
Let its story now be told

Hundred rooms with running water,
Could you ever ask for more?
Not unless you choose a boy-friend,
Meas’ring over five foot four!

See also
 Girton College Boat Club
 :Category:Alumni of Girton College, Cambridge
 :Category:Fellows of Girton College, Cambridge

Eponymous institutions
Girton Grammar School, Bendigo, Victoria, Australia
Girton Hall, University of California, Berkeley

Official College Website
Girton College

References

Sources 
 Books

 

 Web primary sources

 

 Other

 
Alfred Waterhouse buildings
Colleges of the University of Cambridge
Educational institutions established in 1869
Former women's universities and colleges in the United Kingdom
1869 establishments in England
Grade II* listed buildings in Cambridgeshire
University swimming in the United Kingdom